One More River to Cross: Black and Gay in America is a 1996 book written by Keith Boykin, who ran a now-defunct national black gay and lesbian organization. He begins the book by describing his life, including coming out at Harvard Law School, working for President Bill Clinton, and his first sexual experience. He interviews many famous African-American gay men and lesbians such as Cleo Manago, Perry Watkins, and Cheryl Clarke.

He describes the homophobia of celebrated blacks such as Muhammad Ali and Colin Powell. He also details insensitive actions from white gays such as Robert Mapplethorpe and Frank Kameny. Boykin attempts to spell out how racism and homophobia intersect but also diverge in the lives of African-American gay men and lesbians.

See also 
 African-American culture and sexual orientation

References 

1996 non-fiction books
American biographies
Biographies about LGBT people
LGBT literature in the United States
American non-fiction books
LGBT African-American culture
Biographies about African-American people
1990s LGBT literature
Anchor Books books